SalMar ASA is a Norwegian fish farm company and one of the world's largest producers of farmed salmon. The company's main activities include marine-phase farming, broodfish and smolt production, processing and sale of farmed salmon. It holds 100 licenses for production of Atlantic salmon in Norway, located in Trøndelag, Nordmøre and, through its subsidiary Senja Sjøfarm AS, Troms. It also owns 50% of Norskott Havbruk which operates fish farms as Scottish Sea Farms. The company is based in Frøya and is listed on the Oslo Stock Exchange since 2007. The company was founded in 1991, its main shareholder is today the founder's son Gustav Magnar Witzøe.

SalMar sells farmed salmon across Asia, the United States, Canada, the Russian Federation and Norway.

References

External links
 Official site

Food and drink companies of Norway
Companies based in Trøndelag
Food and drink companies established in 1991
Companies listed on the Oslo Stock Exchange
1991 establishments in Norway